James Frederic Hughes (August 7, 1883 – August 9, 1940) was a U.S. Representative from Wisconsin.

Biography 
Born in Green Bay, Wisconsin, Hughes graduated from West Green Bay High School in 1901. After moving to De Pere, Wisconsin in 1901, he was employed as a salesman. He was a member of the De Pere Board of Education from 1914 to 1937). A delegate to the Democratic National Conventions in 1920 and 1928, he was a member of the Democratic State central committee (1920–1924) and chaired the eighth Wisconsin Democratic congressional committee (1928–1932).

Hughes was elected as a member of the Democratic Party to the 73rd Congress (March 4, 1933 – January 3, 1935), but chose not to seek renomination in 1934, resuming a post as sales manager in De Pere, Wisconsin. While in congress, he represented Wisconsin's 8th congressional district. He died in a hospital at Rochester, Minnesota, on August 9, 1940 and was interred at Cady Cemetery in Lawrence, near De Pere.
 

Notes

Sources

External links

1883 births
1940 deaths
School board members in Wisconsin
Politicians from Green Bay, Wisconsin
Democratic Party members of the United States House of Representatives from Wisconsin
20th-century American politicians
People from De Pere, Wisconsin